Surjeet Singh Narwal (born 10 August 1990) is an Indian representative for India in the sport of kabaddi. He was a member of the kabaddi team that won a gold medal in the 2014 Asian Games in Incheon.He was the captain of Puneri Paltan. Currently he is part of Telugu Titans in Pro Kabaddi season 9.

References

Living people
1990 births
Indian kabaddi players
Asian Games medalists in kabaddi
Kabaddi players at the 2014 Asian Games
Asian Games gold medalists for India
Medalists at the 2014 Asian Games
Place of birth missing (living people)
Pro Kabaddi League players